Manhole is a South Korean television series starring Kim Jae-joong, Uee, Baro, Jung Hye-sung. It aired on KBS2, from August 9 to September 28, 2017 on Wednesdays and Thursdays at 22:00 (KST) for 16 episodes.

The drama drew a nationwide rating of 1.4% for its eighth episode. At the time, this was the lowest ever recorded for a drama airing in a regular time slot on broadcast television. Lovely Horribly recorded an even lower single-episode rating of 1.0% in 2018, but Manhole remained the primetime drama with the lowest average rating (2.1%), until Welcome, which aired on the same network and timeslot, broke the record in 2020.

Synopsis
Foreseeing his own fate, he travels from past to present. The main purpose of him traveling through time is to stop his ideal girl's wedding.

Cast

Main
 Kim Jae-joong as Bong Pil
 Uee as Kang Soo-jin
 Jung Hye-sung as Yoon Jin-sook
 Baro as Jo Suk-tae

Supporting

Neighborhood families
 Lee Sang-yi as Oh Dal-soo
 Kang Hong-seok as Yang Koo-gil
 Kim Min-ji as Hong Jung-ae

Main characters' parents
 Joo Jin-mo as Bong Dal
 Kim Hye-ok as Yoon Kkeut-soon
 Woo Hyun as Suk-tae's father
 Seo Hyun-chul as Soo-jin's father
 Lee Yun-kyung as Soo-jin's mother

Strangers in the neighborhood
 Jang Mi-kwan as Park Jae-hyun

Bonbon Hope
 Seo Young as Mi-ja
 Son Ji-an as Yoon-mi

Extended

 Park Ah-in as Park Young-joo
 Jo Seo-hoo as Yoon-mi
 Kim Young-ok (voice only)
 Jung In-gi
 Kim Dae-gon as Jang-hye
 Kim Joong-kil
 Choi Yoon-bin
 Park Hee-kon
 Seon Woo-sung
 Heo Soo-jung
 Son Kyung-won
 Lee Seung-hoon
 Go Man-kyoo
 Ha Jin
 Ri Min
 Lee Jae-eun
 Kim Ji-sun
 Ahn Hee-joo
 Yoo Geum
 Park Sang-yong
 Jo Hee
 Oh Yong
 Kim Kwon as Man attending church
 Kim Kyu-chul as Yang Koo-gil's father
 Song Ha-rim
 Park Chan-hong
 Sung Hyun-joon
 Park Shi-yun
 Heo Soo-jung
 Park Do-joon
 Han Jae-woong
 Kim Bong-soo
 Lee Seung-hyun
 Kim Hae-kon
 Choi Yoon-joon
 Song Kyung-hwa
 Tae Won-suk
 Park Hee-kon
 Lee Dong-hee
 Choi Kyo-shik

Soundtrack

Part 1

Part 2

Part 3

Part 4

Part 5

Part 6

Part 7

Part 8

Part 9

Ratings 
 In this table,  represent the lowest ratings and  represent the highest ratings.
NR denotes that the drama did not rank in the top 20 daily programs on that date.

Awards and nominations

References

External links 
  (in Korean)
 
 
 

Korean Broadcasting System television dramas
Korean-language television shows
2017 South Korean television series debuts
2017 South Korean television series endings
South Korean comedy-drama television series
South Korean fantasy television series
South Korean romantic comedy television series
South Korean time travel television series
Television series by Celltrion Entertainment